Rosanna Schiaffino (25 November 1939 – 17 October 2009) was an Italian film actress. She appeared on the covers of Italian, German, French, British and American magazines.

Early life
She was born in Genoa, Liguria to a well-off family. Her mother encouraged her showbusiness ambitions, helping her to study privately at a drama school. She also took part in beauty contests. When she was 14 she won the Miss Liguria beauty contest, moving into modelling jobs, with photographs in important magazines, including Life.

Film career
She began a promising acting career in the post-neorealist cinema of the 1950s. She was noticed by film producer Franco Cristaldi, who paired her with Marcello Mastroianni in Piece of the Sky in 1959. More important was her second film for him, La sfida (The Challenge), directed by Francesco Rosi, where she made a name for her powerful but sensitive performance as a Neapolitan girl, inspired by the real-life character of Pupetta Maresca. The film was well received at the 1958 Venice Film Festival.

Schiaffino was launched as the "Italian Hedy Lamarr". However, she would have been more appropriately introduced as the new Italian sex goddess after Gina Lollobrigida and Sophia Loren, but in the early 1960s that role was passing to Claudia Cardinale.

She married producer Alfredo Bini in 1966. After several more films, none of them particularly notable, she decided to give up acting. In 1976, she divorced Bini, with whom she had a daughter.

Jet set
Schiaffino began a new life with the jet set. During the summer of 1980, in Portofino, she met the handsome playboy and steel industry heir Giorgio Enrico Falck, who had also just divorced. Their affair was big news for the gossip tabloids.

In 1981 she gave birth to their son, Guido, and in 1982 she married Falck. The marriage and its gradual decline came after she had been diagnosed with breast cancer in 1991, and the couple divorced, leading to unpleasant recriminations over the custody of their son and the inheritance, before they came to an agreement prior to Falck’s demise in 2004.

Death
Rosanna Schiaffino died of cancer on 17 October 2009, aged 69.

Filmography

Totò, lascia o raddoppia? (1956) - Colomba
Roland the Mighty (1956) - Angelica / Angélique
Piece of the Sky (1958) - Marina
La sfida (1958) - Assunta
Dubrowsky (1959) - Masha Petrovieh
Bad Girls Don't Cry (1959) - Rossana
Ferdinando I, re di Napoli (1959) - Nannina
Le bal des espions (1960) - Flora
Minotaur, the Wild Beast of Crete (1960) - Princess Phaedra / Arianna
La Fayette (1961) - Comtesse de Simiane
L'onorata società (1961) - Rosaria, the wife
Le miracle des loups (1961) - Jeanne de Beauvais
Romulus and the Sabines (1961) - Venere / Venus
The Italian Brigands (1962) - Mariantonia
Le Crime ne paie pas (1962) - Francesca Sabelli (segment "Le masque")
Two Weeks in Another Town (1962) - Barzelli
 Axel Munthe, The Doctor of San Michele (1962) - Antonia
Ro.Go.Pa.G. (1963) - Anna Maria (segment "Illibatezza")
The Victors (1963) - Maria
La corruzione (1963) - Adriana
The Long Ships (1964) - Aminah
The Cavern (1964) - Anna
Red Dragon (1965) - Carol
The Mandrake (1965) - Lucrezia
El Greco (1966) - Jeronima de las Cuevas
La strega in amore (1966) - Aura
Drop Dead Darling (1966) - Francesca di Rienzi
The Rover (1967) - Arlette
Encrucijada para una monja (1967) - Sister Maria
Simon Bolivar (1969) - Consuelo Hernandez
Check to the Queen (1969) - Margaret Mevin
7 fois... par jour (1971) - Eva
Trastevere (1971) - Caterina Peretti
In Love, Every Pleasure Has Its Pain (1971) - Betìa
Ettore lo fusto (1972) - Elena
The Heroes (1973) - Katrin, Greek prostitute
The Man Called Noon (1973) - Fan Davidge
Silence the Witness (1974) - Luisa Sironi
The Killer Reserved Nine Seats (1974) - Vivian
Commissariato di notturna (1974) - Sonia
Il magnate (1974) - Clelia
Cagliostro (1975) - Lorenza Balsamo
La trastienda (1975) - Lourdes
La ragazza dalla pelle di corallo (1976) - Laura
Don Giovanni in Sicilia (1977, TV miniseries) - Ninetta (final appearance)

References

External links

 
Rosanna Schiaffino at Allmovie

1939 births
2009 deaths
Deaths from cancer in Lombardy
Italian film actresses
Actors from Genoa